The 1974 World Championship Tennis (WCT) circuit was one of the two rival professional male tennis circuits of 1974, the other being the Grand Prix circuit. It was organized by World Championship Tennis (WCT). It was the fourth edition of the WCT circuit and a total of 84 players participated. All players took part in the opening U.S. Pro Indoor tournament in Philadelphia and afterwards were divided into three groups (red, blue and green) of 28 players, with each group playing eight further tournaments. 

The season final was played in Dallas by the eight best performers, the top two of each group plus the next two highest point winners, and was won by Australian John Newcombe who defeated Björn Borg from Sweden in four sets, 4–6, 6–3, 6–3, 6–2. Newcombe ended the season as prize money and points leader.

Overview

Schedule

January

February

March

April

May

Standings

Red group

Blue group

Green group

* Qualified for the WCT Finals. The best two players from each group qualified plus the next two players with the highest points total.

See also
 1974 Grand Prix circuit
 1974 USLTA Indoor Circuit
 WCT Finals

References

External links
 ATP 1974 results archive

 
World Championship Tennis circuit seasons
World Championship Tennis